Dulari may refer to:

 Dulari, Nepal
Dulari (film), a 1949 Indian Bollywood film
 Dulari (actress) (1927-2013), Bollywood actress 1947-1993